The 1914 Lehigh Brown and White football team was an American football team that represented Lehigh University as an independent during the 1914 college football season. In its third season under head coach Tom Keady, the team compiled an 8–1 record and outscored opponents by a total of 167 to 60. The team played its home games at Taylor Stadium in South Bethlehem, Pennsylvania.

Schedule

References

Lehigh
Lehigh Mountain Hawks football seasons
Lehigh football